Verint Systems is a Melville, New York-based analytics company which was founded in 2002. The company sells software and hardware products for customer engagement management and business intelligence.  Their products are designed to assist clients in data analysis, specifically large data sets.

In 2021, Verint has 9,800+ clients in more than 175 countries, and has 4,300+ employees in various locations internationally. The company was previously a majority-owned subsidiary of Comverse Technology and it was formerly known as Comverse Infosys.  As with Comverse, approximately half of Verint's employees have been located in Israel.  In February 2013, Verint Systems became independent of Comverse, having bought out the latter's stake in it.

History

Founding, early years
Verint started as Comverse Technology's Comverse Infosys business unit, which was created in 1999 although it was also incorporated in Delaware in February 1994 as a wholly owned subsidiary of Comverse Technology. Verint's initial focus was on the commercial call recording market, which at the time was transitioning from analog tape to digital recorders. On June 7, 1999, the company released an Internet Call Waiting service.

Expansion and name change
In 1999, Comverse Infosys was combined with another division of Comverse focused on security and the communications interception market. In 2001, Verint expanded into video security by combining with Loronix Information Systems, Inc., which had been previously acquired by Comverse. In 2002, Comverse Infosys changed its name to Verint Systems Inc.

IPO, acquisitions
In May 2002, Verint completed an IPO and became a public company, although it was still majority owned by Comverse Technology. Since 2006 Verint has acquired several other companies such as  MultiVision Intelligent Surveillance Limited, a networked video security business; CM Insight Limited, a UK-based, customer management company; Mercom Systems Inc., an interaction recording and performance evaluation company; ViewLinks Euclipse Ltd., a provider of data mining and link analysis software; and Witness Systems, Inc. a workforce optimization company.

In July 2008 Amit Bohensky founded Focal-Info, a software company focused on web data extraction and analytics. The following month Focal-Info had been bought by Verint for an undisclosed amount, with Bohensky hired back on to lead Focal-Info's "extendend activity" within Verint. A subsequent acquisition was of Iontas, in early 2010, a provider of desktop analytics solutions.

Beginning with a stock options backdating scandal in 2006, parent company Comverse Technology suffered a series of financial reporting problems, losses and layoffs, with one consequence that both Comverse and Verint were delisted from the NASDAQ stock market in 2007 and ended up on the Pink Sheets. In July 2010, Verint was relisted on the NASDAQ stock market under the symbol VRNT.   By that year, there was considerable talk that Comverse Technology would sell its remaining interest in Verint, with some private equity firms mentioned as possible buyers. In September 2011, Verint acquired Global Management Technologies Corporation, paying around $25 million for it.

Full independence
In August 2012, Verint announced that it would buy out Comverse Technology's stake in it, in a transaction valued at around $800 million.  An FBR Capital Markets analyst said the move "finally eliminates a major overhang on the name by removing Comverse's majority ownership stake."  The deal was finalized in February 2013.

On February 3, 2014, Verint Systems completed acquisition of KANA Software Inc. from Accel-KKR for $514.2 million.

On November 16, 2016, Verint Systems completed acquisition of the customer experience software company OpinionLab for an undisclosed amount.

On December 19, 2017, Verint Systems completed acquisition of the Intelligent Virtual Assistant company Next IT for $30 million cash plus up to $21 million in future payments.

On February 1, 2021, Verint spun off Cognyte, a division catering to governments, to become a pure-play customer engagement vendor.

Products
Verint's products include speech analysis software (used to analyze call center recordings) and
IP surveillance cameras and "smart" video surveillance analysis software.

Verint's RELIANT software provides law enforcement agencies with the ability to monitor and analyze voice, video, and data for a "vast number of targets" on all types of large, complex computer networks, in order to collect evidence for CALEA wiretaps. Multiple national governments including the U.S., U.K., and various European, Asian, and Pacific nations have purchased millions of dollars in Verint surveillance software and equipment.

On January 27, 1997, Comverse Technology Inc. announced the formation of a new private equity fund in partnership with Quantum Industrial Holdings Ltd.

Verint has also received millions of dollars in government contracts to outfit airports, shipping ports, and government facilities with intelligent video surveillance systems with tracking, biometrics, and video analysis features. For example, Unisys chose Verint as a subcontractor on its contract with the Transportation Security Administration, to install video surveillance devices in secure areas of airports across the U.S.

In July 2009, AMR Research ranked Verint 20th in its list of the top 50 global enterprise application vendors.  During the latter portion of the decade of the 2000s, the company has won several awards from CRM Magazine.

Controversy

On February 2, 2021, Amnesty International reported that an Israeli subsidiary of Verint "provided the South Sudanese authorities, including the NSS [National Security Services], with communications interception equipment and annual support services."  The NSS has a record of "harassing, intimidating, threatening, arbitrarily detaining and, in some cases, forcibly disappearing and extra-judicially killing" government critics.  In its report, Amnesty said it "believes that this [sale] goes against Israel’s obligation to protect human rights."

See also
Robotic process automation
Biometrics
Business intelligence
Closed-circuit television camera
Communications Assistance For Law Enforcement Act
Mass surveillance
Surveillance

References

External links

Companies listed on the Nasdaq
American companies established in 2002
Software companies established in 2002
Mass surveillance
Surveillance
Call-recording software
Business intelligence companies
Software companies based in New York (state)
Companies based in Suffolk County, New York
2002 establishments in New York (state)
2002 initial public offerings
Software companies of the United States